Pachyonomastus is a monotypic genus of East African jumping spiders containing the single species, Pachyonomastus kittenbergeri. It was first described by Lodovico di Caporiacco in 1947, and is only found in Africa. The name is a combination of the Ancient Greek  ("pachys"), meaning "thick", and the related genus Onomastus. The species is named in honor of Kálmán Kittenberger, who collected the species.

References

Fauna of East Africa
Monotypic Salticidae genera
Salticidae
Spiders of Africa